Wróblewski is a small lunar impact crater that lies just to the southeast of the huge walled plain Gagarin. The crater Raspletin lies along the rim of Gagarin just to the northwest of Wroblewski. To the south-southeast is Sierpinski. As with many lunar craters of this size, Wroblewski is roughly circular and bowl-shaped. It has undergone some wear along the rim edge from subsequent impacts.

References

External links
LTO-103A4, Lunar Topographic Orthophotomap, Raspletin

Impact craters on the Moon